Jennersville is an unincorporated community located in Penn Township, Chester County, Pennsylvania, United States at latitude 39.823 and longitude -75.87. It is associated for postal purposes with the borough of West Grove, Pennsylvania, and appears on the West Grove U.S. Geological Survey Map.

Jennersville Hospital (closed on December 31, 2021) is located in Jennersville as are the Jennersville Church of the Brethren and a 105,000-square-foot shopping center. The developers of the shopping center claim that 10,500 people live within 3 miles of the center, 23,800 within five mile, and 44,000 within seven miles, based on 2000 U.S. Census data.

Delaware County Community College provides classes at the Pennocks Bridge Campus through a partnership with the Chester County Intermediate Unit.

Notable people
 Eva Griffith Thompson (1842–1925), newspaper editor

References

External links

 Jennersville Regional Hospital

Unincorporated communities in Chester County, Pennsylvania
Unincorporated communities in Pennsylvania
Edward Jenner